Haseeb Hameed (born 17 January 1997) is an English professional cricketer who has played internationally for the England Test cricket team. In domestic cricket, he represents Nottinghamshire, having previously played for Lancashire. Hameed made his Test debut in 2016. He plays as a right-handed opening batsman.

Early and personal life
Hameed was born in Bolton on 17 January 1997 to parents who emigrated from India and was brought up as a Muslim. His father, Ismail Ansari is from Umraj village in Bharuch, Gujarat, India. Hameed was educated at Bolton School, and helped them become only the second school from the north of England to win the independent schools national championship.

Domestic career

Hameed made his first-class debut for Lancashire against Glamorgan in August 2015, following Lancashire's decision to release batsman Paul Horton. Hameed replaced him and opened the batting alongside Karl Brown. He scored 28 in his first innings. He played another three first-class matches that season and averaged 42 with a highest score of 91. In February 2016, Hameed signed a four-year contract for  Lancashire ahead of the 2016 season. He scored over 1,000 runs in that season, breaking Mike Atherton's record as the youngest Lancashire player to reach that landmark.

Hameed made his List A debut for Lancashire in the 2017 Royal London One-Day Cup on 28 April 2017 and played a major role in Lancashire's victory 

In April 2019, as part of the Marylebone Cricket Club University fixtures, Hameed scored a double century against Loughborough MCCU.

In August 2019, Lancashire announced that Hameed would be released at the end of the season; three months later, he signed a two-year contract with Nottinghamshire.

International cricket

Maiden international call-up and debut
In September 2016, Hameed was named in England's Test squad for their tour to Bangladesh. His subsequent debut came in England's following tour of India.

2016: India
Hameed became the youngest debutant to open for England in a Test match, when he played in the first Test against India at Rajkot on 9 November 2016.

On 12 November 2016, the fourth day of the first Test, Hameed scored his maiden Test half century, becoming the third youngest England batsman to reach 50 runs. He eventually was dismissed for 82; this followed on from a promising debut innings of 31. In the second Test, he made 13 in England's first innings, before making 25 in the second innings. In the third Test, he was dismissed for nine in the first innings as England made 283. He broke his finger in his 1st innings dismissal but still went on to score an unbeaten half century batting, below his usual opening position, at number 8 in the second innings. It was later announced he would miss the rest of the tour after flying home to have surgery on his finger.

2021: New Zealand & India
Hameed made his return to the England squad for the Test series against New Zealand in 2021, but did not feature in any Test before being named again in the squad for the series against India. He also scored a century for the County Select XI in a warmup match against India before the series.
Brought into the team for the second Test, he was bowled out for a first ball duck in the first innings, before going on to make 9 runs in his second innings of the match. For the third test of the series, he was promoted to opener in the batting order, and responded by scoring 68 runs, making a 135 run first wicket stand alongside Rory Burns - England's highest since Hameed's 2016 stand of 180 alongside Alastair Cook in Rajkot.

2021: Australia
Hameed was selected for the 2021–22 Ashes. In the 1st test at the Gabba Hameed made 25 in first innings and 27 in 2nd innings. He was dropped for the 5th Test after poor run scores in the first four tests.

Awards
In January 2017, Hameed was awarded the Best at Sport award at the British Muslim Awards.

References

External links
 

1996 births
Living people
People educated at Bolton School
Cricketers from Bolton
English cricketers
England Test cricketers
Lancashire cricketers
Nottinghamshire cricketers
British sportspeople of Indian descent
British Asian cricketers
English people of Indian descent
English people of Gujarati descent
English Muslims